Roderick Hopkins Davis (born August 27, 1955 in the United States) is a former competitive sailor who won Olympic medals for two countries. At the 1984 Summer Olympics in Los Angeles, representing the United States, he won the gold medal in the Soling class along with Robert Haines and Edward Trevelyan. After moving to New Zealand he was chosen to represent that country at the next three Olympic Games. Along with Don Cowie he won a silver medal at the 1992 Summer Olympics in Barcelona, Spain in the Star class.

Davis and Cowie finished fifth at the 1996 Summer Olympics in Atlanta and were also fifth in the Soling class at Sydney along with 3rd crewman Alan Smith.

Davis began his involvement with the America's Cup in 1977, sailing with Lowell North on Enterprise during the 1977 America's Cup defense trials. 

For the 1987 Louis Vuitton Cup, assisted the Consorzio Italia syndicate until he was appointed skipper of the American Eagle Foundation challenge, representing the Newport Harbor Yacht Club.

He joined New Zealand Challenge for the 1988 America's Cup and was their helmsman at the 1992 America's Cup. He was the backup helmsman for oneAustralia at the 1995 Louis Vuitton Cup and acted as the sailing coach of Prada Challenge at the 2000 Louis Vuitton Cup. He remained with Prada Challenge for the 2003 Louis Vuitton Cup, and sailed in the afterguard. He joined Team New Zealand as a coach for the 2007 Louis Vuitton Cup, and remained in this position for the 2013 Louis Vuitton Cup. In 2014 he joined Artemis Racing. He re-joined Team New Zealand in 2016 and was part of their successful 2017 America's Cup campaign.

References

External links
 
 
 
 

1955 births
Living people
1977 America's Cup sailors
1980 America's Cup sailors
1983 America's Cup sailors
1987 America's Cup sailors
1988 America's Cup sailors
1992 America's Cup sailors
1995 America's Cup sailors
2003 America's Cup sailors
American male sailors (sport)
Artemis Racing sailors
Luna Rossa Challenge sailors
Medalists at the 1984 Summer Olympics
Medalists at the 1992 Summer Olympics
New Zealand male sailors (sport)
Olympic gold medalists for the United States in sailing
Olympic sailors of New Zealand
Olympic silver medalists for New Zealand
Sailors at the 1984 Summer Olympics – Soling
Sailors at the 1992 Summer Olympics – Star
Sailors at the 1996 Summer Olympics – Star
Sailors at the 2000 Summer Olympics – Soling
Team New Zealand sailors
Soling class world champions